State Highway 10 is a state highway connecting Sarasamba and Ribbonpalli in the South Indian state of Karnataka.It has a total length of . It was the first State Highway in Karnataka to be tolled.

References 

State Highways in Karnataka
Roads in Kalaburagi district